Bee House is an unincorporated community in Coryell County, Texas, United States. Founded in the 1850s, the community was originally named Boyd's Cove for a James Boyd. The community's post office opened in 1884; residents wanted the post office to be named Bee Hive for the bees found in the area, but the U.S. Postal Service named it Bee House instead. The community also had a school and a Masonic lodge, and as of the 1890s it had four churches. The community still had a church and post office as of the 1980s. Its population was 40 in 2000.

References

Unincorporated communities in Coryell County, Texas
Unincorporated communities in Texas